NPG Records is a record label that was owned by Prince and run by Trevor Guy. "NPG" is short for New Power Generation. It was founded to release his music after Paisley Park Records was shut down by Warner Bros. Records in 1994.

Though the 1994 compilation 1-800-NEW-FUNK featured several artists, NPG Records never developed into a full label like Paisley Park did; instead, it exclusively released Prince's albums or side-projects.

Discography

Prince releases

Other artists

See also 
 List of record labels
 Paisley Park Records

References

 
American record labels
Prince (musician)
Vanity record labels
Record labels established in 1993
Record labels disestablished in 1995
Pop record labels